Sir John Hall may refer to:

John Hall (British Army officer) (1795–1866), British military surgeon
John Hall (New Zealand politician) (1824–1907), New Zealand politician
John Hall (Wycombe MP) (1911–1978), British Conservative politician
John Hathorn Hall (1894–1979), British colonial administrator
John Hall (businessman) (born 1933), land and sports entrepreneur
Sir John Hall, 3rd Baronet (died 1776)

See also
John Hall (disambiguation)